Zodarion hamatum is a spider species found in Italy, Austria and Slovenia.

It' is a European ant-eating spider. Like the closely related Z. italicum, it is nocturnal and captures various ant species.

See also 
 List of Zodariidae species

References

External links 

hamatum
Spiders of Europe
Spiders described in 1964